Murphy's Brewery was a brewery founded in Cork, Ireland, in 1856 by James Jeremiah Murphy (James J. Murphy). It was known as Lady's Well Brewery until it was purchased by Heineken N.V. in 1983, when the name changed to  Murphy Brewery Ireland Ltd. The name of the brewery was changed to Heineken Brewery Ireland, Ltd in 2001. The brewery produces Heineken, Murphy's Irish Stout and other Heineken products for the Irish market.

By 1906, Murphy's Brewery was Ireland's second largest brewer (after Guinness).

Beers

Murphy's Stout

Murphy's Irish Stout is a dry stout, brewed to be less bitter than its chief competitor, Guinness. It is sometimes described as having a slightly nutty flavour, with "coffee undertones". The manufacturers had a television advertising campaign in the 1990s which played on Murphy's positioning as less bitter than its competitors, in which the strapline was "like the Murphy's, I'm not bitter".

Irish Red

In 1983, after the Murphy's brand was bought by Dutch brewer Heineken International, "Irish Red" was launched for the export market, as it was hoped that it would be more popular than stout overseas.

References

Further reading
 Ó Drisceoil, Diarmuid and Ó Drisceoil, Donal The Murphy's story : the history of Lady's Well Brewery, Cork. Cork : Murphy Brewery Ireland, 1997

External links 
Official site

Beer in Ireland
Drink companies of the Republic of Ireland
Food and drink companies established in 1856
Companies based in Cork (city)
Irish brands
Heineken subsidiaries
Heineken brands

de:Murphy’s
fr:Murphy's
nl:Murphy's
pt:Cervejaria Murphy´s